Voika is a village in Nõo Parish, Tartu County in eastern Estonia.

References 

Villages in Tartu County